The 2013–14 Memphis Grizzlies season was the 19th season of the franchise in the NBA and their 13th in Memphis. It was their first season under new head coach Dave Joerger.

In the playoffs, the Grizzlies faced the Oklahoma City Thunder, the team they defeated in last season's Semifinals in five games, in the First Round and lost in seven games.

Key dates
 June 27: The 2013 NBA draft took place at Barclays Center in Brooklyn, New York.
 February 8: The Grizzlies set an NBA record for fewest free-throws scored by a team in a single game when they shot a single free-throw in a win against the Atlanta Hawks.

Draft picks

Roster

Pre-season

|- style="background:#fcc;"
| 1
| October 7
| @ Chicago
| 
| Jerryd Bayless (15)
| Jon Leuer & Ed Davis (5)
| Nick Calathes (8)
| Scottrade Center13,497
| 0–1
|- style="background:#fcc;"
| 2
| October 9
| Dallas
| 
| Jon Leuer (17)
| Jon Leuer & Ed Davis (10)
| Jon Leuer (5)
| FedExForum11,459
| 0–2
|- style="background:#cfc;"
| 3
| October 13
| Haifa
| 
| Tony Allen (19)
| Kosta Koufos (12)
| Randolph & Franklin (5)
| FedExForum11,459
| 1–2
|- style="background:#cfc;"
| 4
| October 15
| Milwaukee
| 
| Quincy Pondexter (24)
| Ed Davis (10)
| Marc Gasol (7)
| FedExForum11,164
| 2–2
|- style="background:#cfc;"
| 5
| October 18
| @ Orlando
| 
| Mike Miller (19)
| Mike Miller (11)
| Nick Calathes (5)
| Amway Center13,041
| 3–2
|- style="background:#cfc;"
| 6
| October 20
| @ Atlanta
| 
| Jerryd Bayless (22)
| Ed Davis (8)
| Nick Calathes (10)
| Philips Arena8,731
| 4–2
|- style="background:#fcc;"
| 7
| October 23
| @ Toronto
| 
| Leuer & Davis (11)
| Ed Davis (9)
| Marc Gasol (6)
| Air Canada Centre 14,421
| 4–3
|- style="background:#fcc;"
| 8
| October 23
| Houston
| 
| Marc Gasol (17)
| Zach Randolph (10)
| Pondexter & Davis (3)
| FedExForum12,271
| 4–4

Regular season

Game log

|- style="background:#fcc;"
| 1 || October 30 || @ San Antonio
| 
| Mike Conley (14)
| Marc Gasol (9)
| Mike Conley (8)
| AT&T Center18,581
| 0–1

|- style="background:#cfc;"
| 2 || November 1 || Detroit
| 
| Tony Allen (22)
| Zach Randolph (10)
| Marc Gasol (5)
| FedExForum18,119
| 1–1
|- style ="background:#fcc;"
| 3 || November 2 || @ Dallas
| 
| Mike Conley (24)
| Zach Randolph (14)
| Mike Conley (8)
| American Airlines Center 20,262
| 1–2
|- style ="background:#cfc;"
| 4 || November 4 || Boston
| 
| Zach Randolph, Mike Conley, & Jerryd Bayless (15)
| Marc Gasol (8)
| Mike Conley (8)
| FedExForum15,872
| 2–2
|- style ="background:#fcc;"
| 5 || November 6 || New Orleans
| 
| Mike Conley (26)
| Mike Miller (6)
| Marc Gasol (4)
| FedExForum15,209
| 2–3
|- style ="background:#cfc;"
| 6 || November 9 || Golden State
| 
| Zach Randolph (23)
| Zach Randolph (11)
| Mike Conley (6)
| FedExForum16,989
| 3–3
|- style ="background:#fcc;"
| 7 || November 11 ||  @ Indiana
| 
| Marc Gasol (15)
| Ed Davis (7)
| Nick Calathes (6)
| Bankers Life Fieldhouse13,130
| 3–4
|- style ="background:#fcc;"
| 8 || November 13 || Toronto
| 
| Mike Conley (29)
| Zach Randolph & Marc Gasol (10)
| Mike Conley (5)
| FedExForum15,971
| 3–5
|- style ="background:#cfc;"
| 9 || November 15 || @ L.A. Lakers
| 
| Zach Randolph (28)
| Zach Randolph (11)
| Marc Gasol (8)
| Staples Center18,997
| 4–5
|- style ="background:#cfc;"
| 10 || November 17 || @ Sacramento
| 
| Zach Randolph (22)
| Zach Randolph (10)
| Marc Gasol (9)
| Sleep Train Arena15,630
| 5–5
|- style ="background:#cfc;"
| 11 || November 18 || @ L.A. Clippers
| 
| Zach Randolph (26)
| Zach Randolph (15)
| Marc Gasol (8)
| Staples Center19,060
| 6–5
|- style ="background:#cfc;"
| 12 || November 20 || @ Golden State
| 
| Zach Randolph (21)
| Zach Randolph (12)
| Mike Conley & Marc Gasol (4)
| Oracle Arena19,596
| 7–5
|- style ="background:#fcc;"
| 13 || November 22 || San Antonio
| 
| Mike Conley (28)
| Zach Randolph (10)
| Tony Allen (4)
| FedExForum17,109
| 7–6
|- style ="background:#fcc;"
| 14 || November 25 || Houston
| 
| Tayshaun Prince (16)
| Kosta Koufos (13)
| Mike Conley (10)
| FedExForum15,246
| 7–7
|- style ="background:#cfc;"
| 15 || November 27 || @ Boston
| 
| Jerryd Bayless (22)
| Kosta Koufos (13)
| Mike Conley (9)
| TD Garden17,319
| 8–7
|- style ="background:#fcc;"
| 16 || November 30 || Brooklyn
| 
| Quincy Pondexter (22)
| Kosta Koufos (11)
| Mike Conley (10)
| FedExForum17,012
| 8–8

|- style ="background:#cfc;"
| 17 || December 3 || Phoenix
| 
| Jon Leuer (23)
| Ed Davis (12)
| Mike Conley (13)
| FedExForum15,069
| 9–8
|- style ="background:#fcc;"
| 18 || December 5 || L.A. Clippers
| 
| Kosta Koufos (17)
| Zach Randolph (12)
| Quincy Pondexter (5)
| FedExForum15,112
| 9–9
|- style ="background:#fcc;"
| 19 || December 7 || Golden State
| 
| Mike Miller (16)
| Kosta Koufos (16)
| Zach Randolph (4)
| FedExForum15,088
| 9–10
|- style ="background:#cfc;"
| 20 || December 9 || Orlando
| 
| Zach Randolph (19)
| Zach Randolph (12)
| Nick Calathes (8)
| FedExForum13,511
| 10–10
|- style ="background:#fcc;"
| 21 || December 11 || Oklahoma City
| 
| Mike Conley (20)
| Zach Randolph (8)
| Mike Conley (9)
| FedExForum16,345
| 10–11
|- style ="background:#fcc;"
| 22 || December 13 || @ New Orleans
| 
| Jon Leuer (19)
| Zach Randolph (10)
| Mike Conley (7)
| New Orleans Arena15,516
| 10–12
|- style ="background:#fcc;"
| 23 || December 15 || Minnesota
| 
| Mike Conley (28)
| Zach Randolph (12)
| Zach Randolph (5)
| FedExForum15,417
| 10–13
|- style ="background:#fcc;"
| 24 || December 17 || L.A. Lakers
| 
| Zach Randolph (18)
| Zach Randolph (16)
| Zach Randolph (5)
| FedExForum17,217
| 10–14
|- style ="background:#fcc;"
| 25 || December 18 || @ Dallas
| 
| Tony Allen (16)
| Tony Allen (11)
| Jerryd Bayless (6)
| American Airlines Center19,425
| 10–15
|- style ="background:#cfc;"
| 26 || December 21 || @ New York
| 
| Zach Randolph (25)
| Zach Randolph (15)
| Mike Conley (8)
| Madison Square Garden19,812
| 11–15
|- style ="background:#cfc;"
| 27 || December 23 || Utah
| 
| Zach Randolph (22)
| Zach Randolph (10)
| Zach Randolph (7)
| FedExForum16,665
| 12–15
|- style ="background:#fcc;"
| 28 || December 26 || @ Houston
| 
| Zach Randolph (23)
| Zach Randolph (17)
| Mike Conley (6)
| Toyota Center18,201
| 12–16
|- style ="background:#cfc;"
| 29 || December 28 || Denver
| 
| Zach Randolph (20)
| Kosta Koufos (12)
| James Johnson (6)
| FedExForum17,017
| 13–16
|- style ="background:#fcc;"
| 30 || December 30 || Chicago
| 
| Mike Conley (26)
| Zach Randolph (10)
| Mike Conley (9)
| FedExForum17,688
| 13–17

|- style ="background:#cfc;"
| 31 || January 2 || @ Phoenix
| 
| Zach Randolph (20)
| Zach Randolph (15)
| Mike Conley (6)
| US Airways Center14,844
| 14–17
|- style ="background:#fcc;"
| 32 || January 3 || @ Denver
| 
| Zach Randolph (25)
| Zach Randolph (13)
| Mike Conley (8)
| Pepsi Center17,608
| 14–18
|- style ="background:#cfc;"
| 33 || January 5 || @ Detroit
| 
| Jon Leuer (23)
| Zach Randolph (16)
| Mike Conley (6)
| The Palace of Auburn Hills14,134
| 15–18
|- style ="background:#fcc;"
| 34 || January 7 || San Antonio
| 
| Mike Conley (30)
| Jon Leuer (9)
| Mike Conley & James Johnson (5)
| FedExForum15,916
| 15–19
|- style ="background:#cfc;"
| 35 || January 10 || Phoenix
| 
| Mike Conley (31)
| Ed Davis (17)
| Zach Randolph (7)
| FedExForum15,916
| 16–19
|- style ="background:#cfc;"
| 36 || January 12 || Atlanta
| 
| Mike Conley (21)
| Zach Randolph (12)
| Mike Conley (13)
| FedExForum16,841
| 17–19
|- style ="background:#cfc;"
| 37 || January 14 || Oklahoma City
| 
| Courtney Lee (24)
| Zach Randolph (13)
| Mike Conley (7)
| FedExForum17,177
| 18–19
|- style ="background:#cfc;"
| 38 || January 15 || @ Milwaukee
| 
| Mike Conley (15)
| Ed Davis (9)
| Mike Conley (5)
| BMO Harris Bradley Center11,379
| 19–19
|- style ="background:#cfc;"
| 39 || January 17 || Sacramento
| 
| Mike Conley (25)
| Zach Randolph (9)
| Mike Conley (6)
| FedExForum17,212
| 20–19
|- style ="background:#fcc;"
| 40 || January 20 || New Orleans
| 
| Zach Randolph (23)
| Zach Randolph (20)
| Marc Gasol (4)
| FedExForum17,485
| 20–20
|- style ="background:#cfc;"
| 41 || January 24 || @ Houston
| 
| Courtney Lee (19)
| Zach Randolph (8)
| James Johnson (5)
| Toyota Center16,998
| 21–20
|- style ="background:#cfc;"
| 42 || January 25 || Houston
| 
| Mike Conley (17)
| Zach Randolph (17)
| James Johnson (8)
| FedExForum17,512
| 22–20
|- style ="background:#cfc;"
| 43 || January 28 || @ Portland
| 
| Zach Randolph (23)
| Zach Randolph (10)
| Mike Conley (7)
| Moda Center19,385
| 23–20
|- style ="background:#cfc;"
| 44 || January 29 || @ Sacramento
| 
| Mike Conley (27)
| Zach Randolph (7)
| Mike Conley (10)
| Sleep Train Arena15,195
| 24–20
|- style ="background:#cfc;"
| 45 || January 31 || @ Minnesota
| 
| Zach Randolph (26)
| Zach Randolph (12)
| Mike Conley (8)
| Target Center17,429
| 25–20

|- style ="background:#cfc;"
| 46 || February 1 || Milwaukee
| 
| Zach Randolph (23)
| Zach Randolph (10)
| Courtney Lee (7)
| FedExForum17,017
| 26–20
|- style ="background:#fcc;"
| 47 || February 3 || @ Oklahoma City
| 
| Zach Randolph (13)
| Zach Randolph (13)
| Tayshaun Prince (5)
| Chesapeake Energy Arena18,203
| 26–21
|- style ="background:#fcc;"
| 48 || February 5 || Dallas
| 
| Zach Randolph (25)
| Zach Randolph (9)
| Marc Gasol (5)
| FedExForum16,188
| 26–22
|- style ="background:#cfc;"
| 49 || February 8 || @ Atlanta
| 
| Zach Randolph (20)
| Marc Gasol (8)
| Marc Gasol (7)
| Philips Arena15,190
| 27–22
|- style ="background:#fcc;"
| 50 || February 9 || @ Cleveland
| 
| Nick Calathes (17)
| Marc Gasol (9)
| Nick Calathes (6)
| Quicken Loans Arena16,484
| 27–23
|- style ="background:#cfc;"
| 51 || February 11 || Washington
| 
| Marc Gasol & Nick Calathes (18)
| Zach Randolph (10)
| Nick Calathes (6)
| FedExForum15,613
| 28–23
|- style ="background:#cfc;"
| 52 || February 12 || @ Orlando
| 
| Zach Randolph (20)
| Courtney Lee (6)
| Nick Calathes (6)
| Amway Center15,310
| 29–23
|- style="text-align:center;"
| colspan="9" style="background:#bbcaff;"|All-Star Break
|- style ="background:#cfc;"
| 53 || February 18 || New York
| 
| Mike Conley (22)
| Zach Randolph (8)
| Nick Calathes (5)
| FedExForum17,317
| 30–23
|- style ="background:#cfc;"
| 54 || February 20 || L.A. Clippers
| 
| Zach Randolph (21)
| Zach Randolph (11)
| Mike Conley (6)
| FedExForum17,963
| 31–23
|- style ="background:#fcc;"
| 55 || February 22 || @ Charlotte
| 
| Mike Conley (16)
| Zach Randolph (11)
| Mike Conley (5)
| Time Warner Cable Arena18,317
| 31–24
|- style ="background:#cfc;"
| 56 || February 26 || L.A. Lakers
| 
| Courtney Lee (18)
| Marc Gasol (12)
| Marc Gasol (5)
| FedExForum16,989
| 32–24
|- style ="background:#fcc;"
| 57 || February 28 || @ Oklahoma City
| 
| Mike Miller (19)
| Zach Randolph (10)
| Mike Conley (9)
| Chesapeake Energy Arena18,203
| 32–25

|- style ="background:#cfc;"
| 58 || March 1 || Cleveland
| 
| Zach Randolph (23)
| Zach Randolph (14)
| Mike Conley (7)
| FedExForum17,011
| 33–25
|- style="background:#cfc;"
| 59
| March 3
| @ Washington
| 
| Tayshaun Prince (21)
| Zach Randolph (10)
| Marc Gasol (8)
| Verizon Center14,065
| 34–25
|- style="background:#fcc;"
| 60
| March 5
| @ Brooklyn
| 
| Jon Leuer (19)
| Kosta Koufos (8)
| Nick Calathes (5)
| Barclays Center17,053
| 34–26
|- style="background:#cfc;"
| 61
| March 7
| @ Chicago
| 
| Marc Gasol (18)
| Zach Randolph (11)
| Mike Conley (7)
| United Center21,318
| 35–26
|- style="background:#cfc;"
| 62
| March 8
| Charlotte
| 
| Mike Conley (20)
| Kosta Koufos (10)
| Allen & Conley (4)
| FedExForum17,298
| 36–26
|- style="background:#cfc;"
| 63
| March 11
|  Portland
| 
| Marc Gasol (19)
| Zach Randolph (12)
| Nick Calathes (9)
| FedExForum17,391
| 37–26
|- style="background:#cfc;"
| 64
| March 12
| @ New Orleans
| 
| Mike Conley (16)
| Gasol & Randolph (9)
| Nick Calathes (7)
| Smoothie King Center16,513
| 38–26
|- style="background:#fcc;"
| 65
| March 14
| @ Toronto
| 
| Zach Randolph (16)
| Calathes & Randolph (8)
| Mike Conley (6)
| Air Canada Centre18,465
| 38–27
|- style="background:#cfc;"
| 66
| March 15
| @ Philadelphia
| 
| Mike Conley (19)
| Ed Davis (11)
| Gasol & Calathes (6)
| Wells Fargo Center15,164
| 39–27
|- style="background:#cfc;"
| 67
| March 19
| Utah
| 
| Zach Randolph (21)
| Zach Randolph (11)
| Mike Conley (7)
| FedExForum17,011
| 40–27
|- style="background:#fcc;"
| 68
| March 21
| @ Miami
| 
| Zach Randolph (25)
| Zach Randolph (14)
| Mike Conley (6)
| American Airlines Arena20,007
| 40–28
|- style="background:#cfc;"
| 69
| March 22
| Indiana
| 
| Mike Conley (21)
| Zach Randolph (13)
| Mike Conley (4)
| FedExForum18,119
| 41–28
|- style="background:#cfc;"
| 70
| March 24
| Minnesota
| 
| Mike Conley (23)
| Marc Gasol (12)
| Mike Conley (6)
| FedExForum17,784
| 42–28
|- style="background:#cfc;"
| 71
| March 26
| @ Utah
| 
| Zach Randolph (22)
| Zach Randolph (13)
| Mike Conley (6)
| EnergySolutions Arena19,081
| 43–28
|- style="background:#fcc;"
| 72
| March 28
| @ Golden State
| 
| Zach Randolph (21)
| Gasol & Randolph (7)
| Mike Conley (6)
| Oracle Arena19,596
| 43–29
|- style="background:#fcc;"
| 73
| March 30
| @ Portland
| 
| Zach Randolph (21)
| Zach Randolph (7)
| Mike Conley (9)
| Moda Center19,994
| 43–30
|- style="background:#cfc;"
| 74
| March 31
| @ Denver
| 
| Zach Randolph (20)
| Zach Randolph (11)
| Randolph, Calathes & Lee (3)
| Pepsi Center14,570
| 44–30

|- style="background:#fcc;"
| 75
| April 2
| @ Minnesota
| 
| Marc Gasol (18)
| Marc Gasol (7)
| Mike Conley (8)
| Target Center12,009
| 44–31
|- style="background:#cfc;"
| 76
| April 4
| Denver
| 
| Marc Gasol (24)
| Zach Randolph (15)
| Randolph & Conley (4)
| FedExForum17,011
| 45–31
|- style="background:#fcc;"
| 77
| April 6
| @ San Antonio
| 
| James Johnson (20)
| Gasol & Randolph (6)
| Mike Conley (6)
| AT&T Center18,581
| 45–32
|- style="background:#cfc;"
| 78
| April 9
| Miami
| 
| Mike Conley (26)
| Marc Gasol (14)
| Mike Conley (6)
| FedExForum18,119
| 46–32
|- style="background:#cfc;"
| 79
| April 11
| Philadelphia
| 
| Marc Gasol (21)
| Zach Randolph (11)
| Mike Conley (8)
| FedExForum17,456
| 47–32
|- style="background:#cfc;"
| 80
| April 13
| @ L.A. Lakers
| 
| Mike Conley (24)
| Marc Gasol (15)
| Mike Conley (8)
| Staples Center18,997
| 48–32
|- style="background:#cfc;"
| 81
| April 14
| @ Phoenix
| 
| Zach Randolph (32)
| Zach Randolph (9)
| Mike Conley (7)
| US Airways Center18,422
| 49–32
|- style="background:#cfc;"
| 82
| April 16
| Dallas
| 
| Zach Randolph (27)
| Zach Randolph (14)
| Marc Gasol (9)
| FedExForum17,323
| 50–32

Playoffs

Game log

|- style="background:#fcc;"
| 1
| April 19
| @ Oklahoma City
|  
| Zach Randolph (21)
| Zach Randolph (11)
| Mike Conley (11)
| Chesapeake Energy Arena18,203
| 0–1
|- style="background:#cfc;"
| 2
| April 21
| @ Oklahoma City
| 
| Zach Randolph (25)
| Tony Allen (8)
| Mike Conley (12)
| Chesapeake Energy Arena18,203
| 1–1
|- style="background:#cfc;"
| 3
| April 24
| Oklahoma City
| 
| Mike Conley (20)
| Zach Randolph (10)
| Zach Randolph (6)
| FedExForum18,119
| 2–1
|- style="background:#fcc;"
| 4
| April 26
| Oklahoma City
| 
| Marc Gasol (23)
| Tony Allen (13)
| Mike Conley (10)
| FedExForum18,119
| 2–2
|- style="background:#cfc;"
| 5
| April 29
| @ Oklahoma City
| 
| Mike Miller (21)
| Marc Gasol (15)
| Gasol, Lee & Conley (4)
| Chesapeake Energy Arena18,203
| 3–2
|- style="background:#fcc;"
| 6
| May 1
| Oklahoma City
|  
| Marc Gasol (17)
| Zach Randolph (8)
| Mike Conley (6)
| FedExForum18,119
| 3–3
|- style="background:#fcc;"
| 7
| May 3
| @ Oklahoma City
| 
| Marc Gasol (24)
| Jon Leuer (7)
| Mike Conley (9)
| Chesapeake Energy Arena18,203
| 3–4

Player statistics

Regular season

|-
| 
| 55 || 28 || 23.2 || .494 || .234 || .628 || 3.8 || 1.7 || style=";"| 1.6 || .3 || 9.0
|-
| 
| 31 || 5 || 21.0 || .377 || .301 || .789 || 1.9 || 2.1 || .6 || .2 || 8.1
|-
| 
| 71 || 7 || 16.5 || .457 || .311 || .611 || 1.9 || 2.9 || .9 || .1 || 4.9
|-
| 
| 73 || 73 || 33.5 || .450 || .361 || .815 || 2.9 || style=";"| 6.0 || 1.5 || .2 || 17.2
|-
| 
| 1 || 0 || 4.0 || . || . || . || .0 || .0 || .0 || .0 || .0
|-
| 
| 63 || 4 || 15.2 || .534 || . || .528 || 4.1 || .4 || .3 || .7 || 5.7
|-
| 
| 21 || 0 || 7.7 || .410 || .455 || style=";"| 1.000 || 1.1 || .3 || .2 || .1 || 1.9
|-
| 
| 59 || 59 || 33.4 || .473 || .182 || .768 || 7.2 || 3.6 || 1.0 || style=";"| 1.3 || 14.6
|-
| 
| 52 || 4 || 18.4 || .464 || .253 || .844 || 3.2 || 2.1 || .8 || 1.1 || 7.4
|-
| 
| 80 || 22 || 16.9 || .495 || . || .645 || 5.2 || .5 || .4 || .9 || 6.4
|-
| 
| 49 || 47 || 30.0 || .476 || .345 || .900 || 2.8 || 1.7 || .9 || .4 || 11.0
|-
| 
| 49 || 0 || 13.1 || .492 || .469 || .787 || 3.2 || .4 || .4 || .3 || 6.2
|-
| 
| style=";"| 82 || 4 || 20.8 || .481 || .459 || .821 || 2.5 || 1.6 || .3 || .1 || 7.1
|-
| 
| 5 || 0 || 13.2 || .375 || .286 || .333 || 1.6 || 1.6 || .6 || .0 || 3.0
|-
| 
| 15 || 2 || 18.0 || .392 || .324 || .808 || 1.7 || 1.3 || .3 || .1 || 6.3
|-
| 
| 76 || 76 || 25.6 || .407 || .290 || .567 || 3.1 || 1.6 || .5 || .3 || 6.0
|-
| 
| 79 || style=";"| 79 || style=";"| 34.2 || .467 || .100 || .742 || style=";"| 10.1 || 2.5 || .7 || .3 || style=";"| 17.4
|-
| 
| 10 || 0 || 5.5 || style=";"| .556 || style=";"| 1.000 || .833 || .2 || .6 || .1 || .1 || 2.7
|}

References

Memphis Grizzlies seasons
Memphis Grizzlies
Memphis Grizzlies
Memphis Grizzlies
Events in Memphis, Tennessee